Abdyl Xhaja was the minister for energy and mineral resources for Albania in the 1992 government of Sali Berisha. He is a member of the Democratic Party of Albania.

References

Living people
Year of birth missing (living people)
Place of birth missing (living people)
Democratic Party of Albania politicians
Government ministers of Albania
Deputy Prime Ministers of Albania
Energy ministers of Albania
20th-century Albanian politicians